Rajevo Selo is a village in eastern Croatia located west of Drenovci, near the border with Bosnia and Herzegovina. The population is 987 (census 2011). The village lies next to the Sava river and the state border with Bosnia and Herzegovina with the village of Gorice on the other bank of the river.

See also
 Vukovar-Syrmia County
Cvelferija

References

Populated places in Vukovar-Syrmia County
Populated places in Syrmia